Transcription initiation factor TFIID subunit 3 is a protein that in humans is encoded by the TAF3 gene.

References

Further reading